Asur (also Romanized as Āsūr and Asoor) is a village in Doboluk Rural District of Arjomand District of Firuzkuh County, Tehran province, Iran. At the 2006 National Census, its population was 766 in 224 households. The following census in 2011 counted 575 people in 192 households. The latest census in 2016 showed a population of 551 people in 191 households; it was the largest village in its rural district.

References 

Firuzkuh County

Populated places in Tehran Province

Populated places in Firuzkuh County